The  superyacht Hampshire was launched at the Feadship yard on Kaag Island as Vanish. The yacht was owned by Larry Van Tuyl before he sold her to Andrew Currie. London based designer Harrison Eidsgaard, designed both the interior and exterior of Hampshire.

Design 
The hull is built out of steel while the superstructure is made out of aluminium with teak laid decks. The yacht is classed by Lloyd's Register and registered in the Cayman Islands.

Engines 
She is powered by twin 1,850hp MTU 12V4000 M53 engines.

See also
 List of motor yachts by length
 List of yachts built by Feadship

References

2016 ships
Motor yachts
Ships built in the Netherlands